Morula chrysostoma is a species of sea snail, a marine gastropod mollusc in the family Muricidae, the murex snails or rock snails. The shell size varies between 15 mm and 20 mm. This species is distributed in the Red Sea, along Aden and in the Indian Ocean along Madagascar.

References

 Dautzenberg, Ph. (1929). Mollusques testacés marins de Madagascar. Faune des Colonies Francaises, Tome III
 Bosch D.T., Dance S.P., Moolenbeek R.G. & Oliver P.G. (1995) Seashells of eastern Arabia. Dubai: Motivate Publishing. 296 pp

External links
Lamarck. P. chrysostoma. Deshayes. Magasin de Zoologie 6, sér. ser. 2
 

Gastropods described in 1844
Morula (gastropod)